Caledonian Braves Football Club is a Scottish semi-professional football club based in North Lanarkshire. They are members of the Lowland Football League, in the fifth tier of the Scottish football league system.

The club originated from Edusport Academy, a residential youth academy for French footballers founded in 2011 and initially based at the Ravenscraig Regional Sports Facility in Motherwell, North Lanarkshire, before relocating to Lesser Hampden in Glasgow in 2015. A second centre based in Edinburgh opened in 2014. From the 2014–15 season onwards, they fielded a team under the Edusport Academy name in Scottish senior football, the only private academy to do so in a recognised senior league. They initially played in the South of Scotland League before winning promotion to the Lowland League in 2017. As Edusport, the senior team played at the Hamilton Palace Sports Ground in Hamilton, South Lanarkshire (2014–2015) and Galabank in Annan, Dumfries and Galloway (2015–2019).

From 2018 onwards, the senior team began to operate separately from the academy after launching a membership scheme, Our Football Club. In 2019 they were rebranded as Caledonian Braves and opened their own Alliance Park ground within Strathclyde Country Park in North Lanarkshire.

History

Academy
The Edusport Academy was founded in 2011 by Chris Ewing with the aim of helping talented young French footballers to develop their skills in football and the English language, and gain opportunities with British professional clubs. Initially, the main training venues were the Ravenscraig Regional Sports Facility in Motherwell, North Lanarkshire, and the Hamilton Palace Sports Ground in Hamilton, South Lanarkshire, with English classes taking place at New College Lanarkshire. Edusport expanded in 2014, opening an Edinburgh centre with training at Ainslie Park and education at Edinburgh College. In 2015, they decided to relocate from Motherwell to a new Glasgow base; the Academy now trains at Lesser Hampden with educational classes at City of Glasgow College.

Four women were added to the Edusport Academy programme in 2015. They are based at the Edinburgh centre and will gain senior experience through a partnership with Spartans of the Scottish Women's Premier League.

Senior football
In June 2014, Edusport Academy successfully applied for membership of the semi-professional South of Scotland League in the sixth tier of the Scottish football league system, becoming the first private football academy in the world to operate a team in a FIFA-recognised senior league. They made further Scottish football history in a league match against Creetown in September 2014, when they first fielded a team composed entirely of French nationals. The senior team won two trophies in their first season, the South of Scotland League Cup and the Cree Lodge Cup. They applied to move up a level to the Lowland League in 2015, but their application was rejected.

Edusport Academy won the 2016–17 South of Scotland League title to gain promotion to the Lowland League in the fifth tier of Scottish football. In February 2018, Ewing announced plans to separate the senior team from the academy and attract a fanbase by launching a new online membership scheme, Our Football Club. Members will have voting and decision-making powers, including a say on choosing a new name, crest and colours for the team. They will be able to recommend potential signings, but will have no say on team selection. Ewing stated at the launch of the project that his aim was to reach the Scottish Premiership by 2025.

At the start of the 2019–20 season Edusport Academy rebranded the club as the Caledonian Braves following a vote online by members of the Our Football Club.com project.

Stadium

For the first season, South of Scotland League home matches were played at the Hamilton Palace Sports Ground in Hamilton, South Lanarkshire. From 2015 onwards, the team groundshared with Annan Athletic at their Galabank stadium in Annan, Dumfries and Galloway. From the start of the 2019–20 Lowland League season, the team play at Alliance Park, their own purpose-built facility at Bothwellhaugh in Strathclyde Country Park near Motherwell, North Lanarkshire. The name of the ground, which was voted for by more than 90% of Our Football Club members, was chosen to reflect the unity between the French and Scottish elements of the club.

Current squad
As of 29 January 2022

Academy staff
As of 29 October 2021

Season-by-season records

Lowland League

† Season curtailed due to coronavirus pandemic

Honours
South of Scotland League
Winners: 2016–17
South of Scotland League Cup
Winners (2): 2014–15, 2015–16
Cree Lodge Cup
Winners: 2014–15
Haig Gordon Cup
Winners: 2018–19
Tweedie Cup
Winners: 2015–16

Affliated club(s)
  Travancore Royals FC (2021- )

References

External links 
 
 Edusport Academy website
 Our Football Club website

South of Scotland Football League teams
Football clubs in Dumfries and Galloway
Sport in Motherwell
Football in North Lanarkshire
2011 establishments in Scotland
Lowland Football League teams
 
Association football clubs established in 2011